The Norton-Griffiths Baronetcy, of Wonham in the parish Betchworth in the County of Surrey, is a title in the Baronetage of the United Kingdom. It was created on 14 June 1922 for the soldier, businessman and Conservative politician John Norton-Griffiths. Born John Griffiths, he had assumed by deed poll the additional surname of Norton in 1917.

Norton-Griffiths baronets, of Wonham (1922)
Sir John Norton-Griffiths, 1st Baronet (1871–1930)
Sir Peter Norton-Griffiths, 2nd Baronet (1905–1983)
Sir John Norton-Griffiths, 3rd Baronet (1938–2017)
Sir Michael Norton-Griffiths, 4th Baronet (born 1941)

Notes

References
Kidd, Charles, Williamson, David (editors). Debrett's Peerage and Baronetage (1990 edition). New York: St Martin's Press, 1990, 

Norton-Griffiths
People from Betchworth